Mary Finlay may refer to:
 Mary Lou Finlay, Canadian radio and television journalist
 Mary McKenzie Finlay, Australian army nurse and school matron
 Mary Finlay Geoghegan, née Finlay, Irish judge and lawyer